Irving Kahal (March 5, 1903, Houtzdale, Pennsylvania – February 7, 1942, New York City) was a popular American song lyricist active in the 1920s and 1930s.  He is best remembered for his collaborations with composer Sammy Fain which started in 1926 when Kahal was working in vaudeville sketches written by Gus Edwards. Their collaboration lasted 16 years, until Kahal's death in 1942.

Among many fine songs, the stand-out was "You Brought a New Kind of Love to Me" on which Pierre Norman lent a hand, which was sung by Maurice Chevalier in the film The Big Pond (1930) effectively becoming his signature tune, and featured by Frank Sinatra on his magisterial album Songs For Swingin' Lovers.

The Fain/Kahal catalogue also includes "Let a Smile Be Your Umbrella" (1928) with Francis Wheeler,  "Wedding Bells Are Breaking Up That Old Gang of Mine" (1929) with Willie Raskin, "By a Waterfall" (1930), "When I Take My Sugar to Tea" (1931) with Pierre Norman, "I Can Dream, Can't I?" (1938) and "I'll Be Seeing You", which was written in 1938, but became a hit in 1943 especially among the families of servicemen sent overseas.

In 1970, Irving Kahal was inducted into the Songwriters Hall of Fame.

External links
Irving Kahal's entry in the Songwriters' Hall of Fame

 Irving Kahal recordings at the Discography of American Historical Recordings.

1903 births
1942 deaths
Songwriters from Pennsylvania
Jewish American songwriters
20th-century American musicians
20th-century American Jews